Nebraska Highway 2 (N-2) is a state highway in Nebraska consisting of two discontinuous segments. The western segment begins at the South Dakota border northwest of Crawford and ends southeast of Grand Island at an intersection with Interstate 80 (I-80).  The eastern segment begins in Lincoln and ends at the Iowa border at Nebraska City.  Previously, the two segments were connected via a route shared with U.S. Highway 34 (US 34) between Grand Island and Lincoln.

Route description

Western segment
The western segment of N-2 begins at the South Dakota border north of Crawford in a concurrency with N-71.  The road goes east, southeast, and then south into Crawford.  In Crawford, there is a concurrency with US 20.  N-2 and N-71 both continue south from Crawford through Marsland, Nebraska.  The two highways split west of Hemingford, Nebraska and N-2 turns east towards Hemingford.  At Hemingford, N-2 turns southeast towards Alliance.  At Berea, N-2 meets US 385 and the two overlap into Alliance.

At Alliance, N-2 goes east into the Sand Hills.  It goes through several small towns, including Hyannis, Mullen and Thedford.  In Thedford, N-2 briefly overlaps US 83.  East of Thedford, near Halsey, is the Nebraska National Forest.  At Dunning, N-2 intersects N-91 and turns southeasterly towards Broken Bow and Grand Island.

After turning southeasterly at Dunning, N-2 meets N-92 in Merna.  The two highways overlap through Broken Bow and separate when they meet US 183 in Ansley.  N-2 meets N-10 in Hazard, N-68 in Ravenna and N-11 in Cairo.  On the northwest edge of Grand Island, N-2 becomes a four-lane divided highway and then encounters US 281.  N-2 then follows US 281 along the western edge of Grand Island until it meets US 34 and then those two routes overlap through the southern edge of Grand Island.  N-2 and US 34 cross the Platte River and shortly thereafter, they separate and N-2 turns south towards Interstate 80 (I-80). At I-80, the western segment of N-2 ends.

Eastern segment
The eastern segment of N-2 begins as the Lincoln South Beltway, a freeway south of Lincoln, at a semi-directional T interchange with US 77. Passing by Lincoln to the south, N-2 becomes a four-lane divided highway following a diamond interchange with Nebraska Parkway, its former alignment through the city, southeast of it. It soon encounters several small towns and highways. Near Syracuse, there is a bypass of that community and there is a freeway exit for N-50. It continues east and near Nebraska City, it meets US 75 and the two highways are together briefly until the southern edge of Nebraska City. Also at this intersection, N-2 Business begins and goes through Nebraska City. After they separate, N-2 heads east and then northeast, meets the eastern end of N-2 Business and crosses the Missouri River over the Nebraska City Bridge and enters Iowa. In Iowa, the highway continues as Iowa Highway 2.

The eastern segment of N-2 serves as part of a connecting route, along with US 77, between I-29 in Iowa and I-80 in Lincoln.  It allows traffic coming from Kansas City, Missouri to go to Lincoln and points west of Lincoln to bypass Omaha. To better facilitate this link between I-80 and I-29, in February 2020, the Nebraska DOT began a major project to construct the Lincoln South Beltway to carry N-2. This modern divided and controlled access freeway will give a direct route from 120th Street to US 77 near Saltillo. Construction was planned for completion in 2023. The beltway opened to traffic on December 14, 2022, six months ahead of expected in May 2023. However, the interchanges at Bennet Road-Jamaica Avenue and 82nd Street-84th Street are not expected to open until May 2024.

The eastern segment of Nebraska Highway 2 has the commemorative name of Jerome and Betty Warner Memorial Highway.  The portion of the highway east of the west U.S. 75 junction to the Nebraska City Bridge in the Nebraska City area is known as the J. Sterling Morton Beltway, in honor of the creator of Arbor Day and the former Secretary of Agriculture.

Major intersections

See also

References

External links

 Nebraska Roads: NE 1-10

002
Transportation in Sioux County, Nebraska
Transportation in Dawes County, Nebraska
Transportation in Box Butte County, Nebraska
Transportation in Sheridan County, Nebraska
Transportation in Grant County, Nebraska
Transportation in Hooker County, Nebraska
Transportation in Thomas County, Nebraska
Transportation in Blaine County, Nebraska
Transportation in Custer County, Nebraska
Transportation in Sherman County, Nebraska
Transportation in Buffalo County, Nebraska
Transportation in Hall County, Nebraska
Transportation in Merrick County, Nebraska
Transportation in Hamilton County, Nebraska
Transportation in Lincoln, Nebraska
Transportation in Otoe County, Nebraska